Florian Prey (born 1959 in Hamburg) is a German opera singer (lyrical baritone).

Bibliography 
CD 2: Neueinspielung der Winterreise (Schubert) by Florian Prey (baritone) and Wolfgang Leibnitz (piano).

References

External links 
 
 Florian Prey Homepage
 Website des kleinen Sommerfestivals
 Florian Prey, "Ungeduld" Franz Schubert: "Die schöne Müllerin" (YouTube)

1959 births
Living people
Musicians from Hamburg
German operatic baritones
20th-century German male opera singers
21st-century German male opera singers
Date of birth missing (living people)